This list of Bangladesh-flagged cargo ships consists of vessels which are registered in Bangladesh and subject to the laws of that country. Any ship which flew the flag at any point in its career, and is present in the encyclopedia, is listed here.

List of ships

References 

Bangladesh
Bangladesh
Ships of Bangladesh